Alberta Provincial Highway No. 13, commonly referred to as Highway 13, is an east–west highway through central Alberta. East of the City of Wetaskiwin, it generally parallels a Canadian Pacific rail line.

Route description 
From the west, Highway 13 begins at Alder Flats before intersecting Highway 22. It continues east, passing south of Buck Lake and Winfield before crossing Highway 20.

East of Highway 2, Highway 13 enters Wetaskiwin as 40 Avenue and turns north along Highway 2A (56 Street).  At the north side of Wetaskiwin, it turns east and passes north of Gwynne through Bittern Lake. After crossing Highway 21, it enters Camrose as 48 Avenue.

East of Camrose, Highway 13 travels generally southeast, passing by Ohaton, Bawlf, Daysland and Strome prior to an intersection with Highway 36 (Veterans Memorial Highway) in Killam.  The highway continues southeast passing by Sedgewick, Lougheed, Hardisty, Amisk and Hughenden, crossing Highway 41 north of Czar. The road travels by Metiskow, through Provost, and by Hayter.  Upon entering Saskatchewan, Highway 13 continues as Saskatchewan Highway 14 to Saskatoon.

History 
The section of Highway 13 from Wetaskiwin to Winfield was originally designated as Highway 19, but was renumbered in the late 1960s. Highway 13 was extended further west to Alder Flats in  when Highway 612 was renumbered, coinciding with the commissioning of Highway 22 north of Cremona.

Major intersections 
From west to east:

Highway 13A 
Alberta Provincial Highway No. 13A is the designation of the following two current and one former alternate routes of Highway 13.
Ma-Me-O Beach

It provides access to the Summer Village of Ma-Me-O Beach on the southern shore of Pigeon Lake. This segment, which runs north of Highway 13, formed the original Highway 13 alignment prior to it being realigned to bypass the Indian reserve and summer village to the south in the 2000s.

Camrose

Highway 13A serves as the main dangerous goods route through Camrose, as dangerous good are prohibited on Highway 13 (48 Avenue) through the centre of the city, and is maintained by the City of Camrose.

Wetaskiwin
Highway 13A is a former alternate route of Highway 13 through Wetaskiwin. The route was decommissioned in mid-1980s.

References

External links 

013
Camrose, Alberta